Deepwater may refer to ocean water in the abyssal zone, hadal zone, or other deep ocean zones.

Deepwater may also refer to:

Entertainment 
 Deep Water (Highsmith novel), a 1957 a psychological thriller novel by Patricia Highsmith
 Deepwater (film), a 2005 neo-noir film based on the novel
 Deepwater trilogy, a series of novels by Ken Catran
 Deepwater, a novel by Matthew F. Jones published in 1999
 Deep Water (film), a 2022 psychological thriller film

Places

Australia
 Deepwater, New South Wales, a village 
 Deepwater, Queensland, a locality in the Gladstone Region
 Deepwater, South Australia
 Deepwater National Park, a coastal national park in Queensland
 Deepwater River, a river in New South Wales

United States
 Deepwater, Missouri, a city in Henry County, Missouri
Deepwater Township, Bates County, Missouri
Deepwater, New Jersey, a community in Pennsville, New Jersey
Deepwater Shoals Light, a lighthouse in Virginia
Deepwater Terminal Railroad, a terminal railroad in Virginia
Deepwater Railway, a short line railroad in West Virginia

Other uses
 Deepwater drilling
 Deepwater Horizon oil spill
 Integrated Deepwater System Program,  U.S. Coast Guard initiative commonly known as Deepwater

See also
 Deep Water (disambiguation)
 Deepwater Horizon (disambiguation)